Andrea L. Gropman (née Saperstein) is an American pediatric neurologist specializing in neurodevelopmental disabilities and neurogenetics. She is a professor of pediatrics and neurology at the George Washington University School of Medicine & Health Sciences. Gropman is chief of neurogenetics and neurodevelopmental pediatrics and an attending neurologist at Children's National Hospital.

Life 
Saperstein's mother is a teacher and her father is a journalist. Her little brother, David Saperstein, also became a neurologist. They attended high school in New England. Gropman earned a B.A. in biology and biochemistry from Brandeis University in 1985. She completed a M.D. at the University of Massachusetts Chan Medical School in 1992. Gropman was a pediatric resident at the Johns Hopkins Hospital from 1992 to 1994. She completed a fellowship in neurology at the Children's National Hospital from 1997 to 2000. She conducted postdoctoral research in genetics and biochemical genetics at the National Human Genome Research Institute from 1997 to 2000.

Gropman is a professor of pediatrics and neurology at the George Washington University School of Medicine & Health Sciences. She is chief of neurogenetics and neurodevelopmental pediatrics and an attending neurologist at Children's National Hospital. Gropman specializes in neurogenetics with a focus on mitochondrial disorders and Smith–Magenis syndrome.

References 

Living people
Year of birth missing (living people)
Place of birth missing (living people)
Brandeis University alumni
University of Massachusetts Medical School alumni
George Washington University School of Medicine & Health Sciences faculty
Physicians of the Children's National Hospital
American neurologists
Women neurologists
Pediatric neurologists
21st-century American women physicians
21st-century American physicians
American women geneticists
American medical researchers
Women medical researchers
Physician-scientists
American pediatricians
Women pediatricians
21st-century American biologists